Battle of Cellorigo may refer to either of two battles that took place at Cellorigo:
First Battle of Cellorigo, 882
Second Battle of Cellorigo, 883